Juan Andrés Mitrovic Guic (21 May 1921 – 13 July 2008) was a Chilean basketball player. He competed in the men's tournament at the 1948 Summer Olympics.

References

External links

1921 births
2008 deaths
Chilean men's basketball players
Olympic basketball players of Chile
Basketball players at the 1948 Summer Olympics
People from Iquique